Royal Exchange may refer to:

North East Quarter, Belfast, a planned city centre development formerly known as Royal Exchange.
Royal Exchange, Dublin, now City Hall, Dublin
Royal Exchange, Edinburgh, now the Edinburgh City Chambers
Royal Exchange, London, a centre of commerce in the City of London
Royal Exchange, Manchester, a 19th-century classical building, home of the Royal Exchange Theatre
Royal Exchange (New York), former market and meeting hall
The Royal Exchange (film), 2017 Belgian-French film

See also
Royal Exchange Assurance Corporation, a London insurance company
Royal Exchange Hotel, Brisbane, a popular pub
Royal Exchange Square